The Commissioner's Historic Achievement Award is awarded by the Commissioner of Baseball, the chief executive of Major League Baseball (MLB), to a group or person who has made a "major impact on the sport" of baseball. It is not an annual award; rather, the Commissioner presents it at his discretion. The trophy is a gold baseball sitting atop a cylindrical silver base, created by Tiffany & Co.  The award has been presented sixteen times: thirteen times to players, once to a team, and twice to a non-player. Mark McGwire and Sammy Sosa were the first to receive the award for their parts in the 1998 MLB home run record chase. The most recent recipient is Shohei Ohtani, who was honored in 2021 for being the first player in MLB history to be an All-Star as both a starting pitcher and a lead-off hitter in the 2021 All-Star Game and for completing a two-way season as a hitter and as a pitcher. The 2001 Seattle Mariners won the award as a team for posting a 116–46 record one season after losing Alex Rodriguez to the Texas Rangers. Roberto Clemente, the 2006 awardee, is the only player to receive the award posthumously; his award was accepted by his wife, Vera.

Three years after McGwire and Sosa were honored, Cal Ripken Jr. and Tony Gwynn, both of whom retired after the 2001 season, received the award and were honored at the 2001 MLB All-Star Game; Ripken was elected to the American League All-Star team as a starter at third base, while Gwynn was later added as an honorary member of the National League team. During the first inning of the game, Rodriguez, who had been elected the starter at shortstop—the position at which Ripken played for most of his career—switched positions with Ripken for the first inning of the game as a tribute. Including the presentation of the award to the Mariners following the season, the 2001 season's three awards are the most presented in a single year.

Barry Bonds received the award in 2002, becoming the third player so honored for breaking the single-season home run record. Bonds was the first of two players to receive the award that season, along with Rickey Henderson. The award was given in each year from 2004 until 2007: Roger Clemens was honored during the 2004 All-Star Game, and Ichiro Suzuki was presented with the award for breaking the single-season hits record in 2005. Rachel Robinson was honored in 2007, receiving the award for establishing the Jackie Robinson Foundation. She was the first woman and the first non-player to be thus honored. In 2014 Vin Scully became the second non-player to be honored.

Awardees

References
General

Inline citations

Major League Baseball trophies and awards
Awards established in 1998